John Lewis Hart (February 18, 1931 – April 7, 2007) was an American cartoonist noted as the creator of the comic strips B.C. and The Wizard of Id. Brant Parker co-produced and illustrated The Wizard of Id. Hart was recognized with several awards, including the Swedish Adamson Award and five from the National Cartoonists Society. In his later years, he was known (and sometimes criticized) for incorporating Christian themes and messages into his strips. Hart was referred to by Chuck Colson in a Breakpoint column as "the most widely read Christian of our time," over C. S. Lewis, Frank E. Peretti, and Billy Graham.

Biography
Born in Endicott, New York, Hart's first published work was in Stars and Stripes while he served in Korea as an enlisted member of the United States Air Force. Returning in 1953, he published cartoons in The Saturday Evening Post, Collier's Weekly and other magazines. His pre-cartooning employment included working in a barbecue restaurant and sign painting. Hart's biggest success, B.C., was created in 1957 and began appearing in national daily newspapers on February 17, 1958. Hart also co-created and wrote the comic strip The Wizard of Id, drawn by Brant Parker, which has been distributed since November 9, 1964.

According to Hanna-Barbera animator Ed Benedict, the animation powerhouses approached Hart in 1960 pitching a prime time animated B.C. series. Talks fell through with HB  retooling the concept into what eventually became The Flintstones.

Hart died of a stroke on April 7, 2007. According to his wife Bobby, he was working at his drawing table at the time of his death. His co-creator for The Wizard of Id, Brant Parker, died just eight days later, on April 15, 2007.

Religious convictions

Hart was raised in a casually religious family, and he attended Christian Sunday School regularly. Although his formal education ended with high school, he was fascinated by the Bible from a young age.
In 1984 there was a distinguishable shift in Hart's spirituality, and Hart and wife Bobby began attending a congregation of the Presbyterian Church in Nineveh, New York. Hart attributed his religious awakening to a father-son team of contractors who installed a satellite dish at his home. 
Hart's increasingly deep religious faith, and the staunch theological and political conservatism that accompanied it, came to be the source of considerable controversy in the later years of his life. In a 1999 interview with The Washington Post, for example, he stated that "Jews and Muslims who don't accept Jesus will burn in Hell" and that "homosexuality is the handiwork of Satan." In the same piece, Hart opined that "the end of the world is approaching, maybe by the year 2010."
The lion's share of controversy, however, came from Hart's increasing tendency to incorporate his religious and political themes and ideals into his comic strips, especially B.C. Some newspapers refused to print strips with overtly religious themes or, as with the Los Angeles Times, moved them to the religious section of the newspaper.

Controversial strips
Two strips in particular were controversial. The B.C. strip for April 15, 2001, which was Easter, portrayed a Jewish menorah with seven candles progressively burning out as the strip captions ran the words of Jesus Christ. At the end, the outer arms of the candelabrum broke away, leaving a Christian cross, with the final panel portraying the opened and empty tomb of Christ. Critics including the Anti-Defamation League and the American Jewish Committee argued that Hart's strip portrayed replacement theology, that is, the conception of Christianity as supplanting Judaism. Hart offered an apology "if I have offended any readers," but still thought the strip could increase "religious awareness" and claimed that he had meant the strip to be a tribute to both religions.

Another B.C. strip, which ran November 10, 2003, showed an outhouse with a traditional crescent, which a character entered with a vertical graphic "SLAM", only to ask, "Is it just me, or does it stink in here?" Critics including the Council on American-Islamic Relations claimed that the combination of the vertical bar and the "SLAM", as well as the crescent moons both in the sky and on the outhouse, made the strip a slur on Islam. Hart denied that it was anything but an outhouse joke.

Personal life
Hart was an active member of his local community — the area of Greater Binghamton in Broome County, New York, which shares a common abbreviation of "B.C." Hart donated B.C.-based drawings and logos free of charge to  many entities and organizations found in the Broome County area, including logos for:
 B.C. Transit — Caveman on Wheel
 Broome County Parks — Dinosaur
 Broome County Meals on Wheels — Caveman on Wheel with Food
 Southern Tier Red Cross — Caveman building Red Cross with Bricks
 Broome County Celtic Pipes and Drums — Caveman wearing Kilt and playing Bagpipes
 Broome County Celtic Kazoos — Irish Caveman with Kazoo
 B.C. Open PGA Tour Event (1971–2006) — Caveman golfing
 Broome Dusters NAHL Hockey Club — Caveman with hockey stick
 B.C. Icemen UHL Hockey Club — Brute Cavemen playing hockey
 Southern Tier Independence Center — Caveman in stone wheelchair stuck in cave doorway, "Wiley" character navigating a landscape full of holes
 
Hart's involvement with the B.C. Open dated back to the early 1970s, and characters from B.C. were used extensively in advertising and marketing materials for the event, including the winner's trophy, which was a bronzed version of a hapless B.C. Caveman golfing, a light-hearted trophy when compared to many others, leading it to have earned the designation of being "voted by the players on Tour as the best trophy on Tour; the one that they would love to have."

Additionally, Hart contributed original panels of B.C. strips for charity auctions with the Binghamton, New York-based PBS affiliate, WSKG-TV. He also provided album cover art for the 1999 album Still Fresh by the world-famous jazz vocal group The Four Freshmen, and his strips for B.C. were the inspiration for the mascot of UC Irvine, the anteater.

Tribute

Hart was memorialized in a May 14, 2007, strip of the comic strip Mother Goose & Grimm. In the June 20, 2007, Blondie strip, the last panel shows Mr. Dithers saying, "Boy oh boy, that Johnny Hart sure knew his stuff, didn't he?"  Bruce Tinsley honored Hart in his Mallard Fillmore strip of July 10, 2007.

There was also a tribute in The Wizard of Id strip. In the February 14, 2008, strip, two peasant women are talking. One who has just bought some flowers says: "How come you don't celebrate Valentine's Day?" and the other answers: "My Hart isn't in it this year."

Mastroianni Poems

Traditionally, every December 3, Johnny Hart would draw a B.C. cartoon with his wife Ida "Bobby" Hart portrayed as the queen of the ant colony, to celebrate her birthday. On December 3, 2007, his grandson Mason Mastroianni carried on the tradition, a practice he would keep up yearly until 2019, the year after Bobby Hart's death. In the 2007 comic, four ants (representing members of the Hart-Mastroianni family) present a despondent Queen Ida with the following poem.

Happy Birthday to Our Queen,
This day we will remember.
Although this year she lost her King,
His love will live forever.

Afterwards, Queen Ida watches the ants walk away and remarks "They're all Hart". Six days earlier, Mastroianni had drawn a Thanksgiving cartoon in which B.C.'s resident poet Wiley honored Hart's memory with the following, more personal verse:

I struggle finding thanks this year,
I miss your warm embrace.
Yet gazing at your photograph,
A smile adorns my face.
So when it's time to give our thanks,
The truth we can't ignore,
It's memories of loved ones lost
That we are thankful for. 

Mastroianni also had Wiley compose a poem shortly following Brant Parker's death; the poem, honoring the legacies of many past comic strip writers (Hart and Parker included), was published May 27, 2007:

Hear the sad bugler play taps to his heart
as he drifts back in time through his tears
waxing nostalgic for past comic art
he sounds the ROLL CALL o'er the years
Herriman and Gould, Caniff, Schulz, and Capp
The names resound through the ages
Kelly and Young and dearest Dik Browne
names that graced these very pages
Otto and Rube and Vip and Zack
are what Funnies are all about
And who can foo-get Bill Holman Yes!
(a Notary Sojac no doubt)
These are the ones we oft bemoan
whose genius flowed forth with ease
Remember dear friends, if it wasn't for them...
we may have never loved these...Parker and Hart.

Awards
With the release of Wizard of Id in 1964, Hart became one of only four cartoonists to have two comic strips appearing in over 1000 papers each. He won numerous awards for his work, including the National Cartoonists Society's Reuben award for B.C. in 1968 and Wizard of Id in 1984.
1967 – BC – Best Humor Strip
National Cartoonists Society Newspaper Comic Strip (Humor) Award for B.C.

1968 – BC– Reuben Award – Outstanding Cartoonist of the Year
National Cartoonists Society

1970 – BC –  – Best Cartoonist of the Year
The International Congress of Comics – Lucca, Italy. This was the first time this award was given to an American cartoonist.

1971 – BC – Best Cartoonist of the Year – France
1971 – Wizard of Id – Best Humor strip – Brant Parker
National Cartoonists Society

1972 – NASA Public Service Award
For outstanding contributions to NASA

1973 – Best Animation Feature
The National Cartoonist Society 
"B.C. The First Thanksgiving"

1974 – Silver Bell Award – Best Animated Television Commercial
The Advertising Council
"B.C. Tickets for ACTION"

1974 – Golden Spike Award – Best Animated Television Commercial
The International Society of Radio and Television Broadcasters
"B.C. 'A' We're the ACTION Corps"

1976 – BC – Adamson Award ("The Sam" Adamson Award) – Best International Comic Strip Cartoonist
The Swedish Academy of Comic Art

1976 - Inkpot Award

1976 – Wizard of Id – Best Humor strip – Brant Parker
The National Cartoonist Society

1980 – Wizard of Id – Best Humor strip – Brant Parker
The National Cartoonist Society

1981 – BC – The Elzie Segar Award – Outstanding Contribution to the Profession of Cartooning
King Features Syndicate

1982 – Golden Sheaf Award – Spontaneous Human Category
The Yorkton Short Film and Video Festival – Canada	
"B.C. A Special Christmas"

1982 – BC – Special Jury Award
The Yorkton Short Film and Video Festival – Canada
"B.C. A Special Christmas"

1982 – Wizard of Id – Best Humor strip – Brant Parker
The National Cartoonist Society

1983 – Wizard of Id – Best Humor strip – Brant Parker
The National Cartoonist Society

1984 – Wizard of Id – Reuben Award – Outstanding Cartoonist of the Year – Brant Parker
The National Cartoonist Society

1985 – Wizard of Id – "The Sam" Adamson Award – Best International Comic Strip Cartoonist – Brant Parker
The Swedish Academy of Comic Art

1986 – BC – Katie Award – Best Magazine Cover – "D Magazine"
The Press Club of Dallas

1986 – Wizard of Id – The Elzie Segar Award – Outstanding Contribution to the Profession of Cartooning – Brant Parker
King Features Syndicate

1988 – BC – Telly Award – Best Television Commercial – Animation
"Less filling" – Monroe Shocks

1989 – BC – Best Newspaper Strip
National Cartoonist Society

1992 – BC – Max and Moritz Award – Best Comic Strip
The Comic Salon – Erlangen, Germany

1995 – BC – Wilbur Award – Editorial Cartoon / Comic Strip Category
The Religious Public Relations Council Inc – Dallas
Easter 1995 cartoon

References

External links
Official Website for John Hart Studios — johnhartstudios.com
Official B.C. Webpage by the Hart family — johnhartstudios.com/bc
Official Wizard of Id Webpage by the Hart family — johnhartstudios.com/wizardofid
Official Dogs of 'C' Kennel (by Johnny's grandsons Mick and Mason) Webpage johnhartstudios.com/ckennel
Johnny Hart biography on Lambiek Comiclopedia
Creators Syndicate: B.C.
Creators Syndicate: The Wizard of Id
Johnny Hart tribute art and quotations Creators Syndicate

"Johnny Hart: Not Caving In" — profile in Christianity Today, March/April 1997

1931 births
2007 deaths
People from Endicott, New York
American comic strip cartoonists
Reuben Award winners
American Christians
United States Air Force airmen
United States Air Force personnel of the Korean War
Artists from Binghamton, New York
Inkpot Award winners